Man of Will is a 2017 South Korean drama film directed by Lee Won-tae, starring Cho Jin-woong and Song Seung-heon.

References

External links

Man of Will at Naver
Man of Will at Daum
Man of Will at Cine 21

2017 films
2010s historical drama films
South Korean historical drama films
Films set in Korea under Japanese rule
2017 drama films
2010s South Korean films
Films set in South Hwanghae Province
Films set in Incheon